The Westmead Institute for Medical Research is a large medical research institute located at Westmead in the western suburbs of Sydney, Australia.  The institute is closely affiliated with Sydney Medical School and Westmead Hospital and comprises approximately 450 medical research and support staff.  Originally named the Westmead Millennium Institute for Medical Research, the institute was founded in 1996 through the merging of five research groups at the Westmead health campus, initially comprising just 40 medical researchers, and was renamed on 18 November 2015. The Westmead Institute has grown rapidly on the basis of peer-reviewed funding.

Organisation 
Research is organised into five key biological areas:
 Infectious and immune diseases
 Cancer and leukaemia
 Liver and metabolic diseases
 Eye and brain-related disorders
 Heart and respiratory disorders

Professor Tony Cunningham  has been the executive director of the institute since its inception.

Affiliations
The institute is closely affiliated with the Sydney Medical School at the University of Sydney. As of 20 March 2016, the institute hosted more than 119 higher-degree research students.

See also

 Health in Australia

References

External links 
 The Westmead Institute for Medical Research home page
 Westmead Medical Research Foundation home page
 The University of Sydney – Westmead Clinical School home page

Medical research institutes in Sydney
Sydney Medical School
1996 establishments in Australia
Research institutes established in 1996
Buildings and structures awarded the Sir John Sulman Medal